A Kilkenny County Council election was held in County Kilkenny, Ireland on 24 May 2019 as part of that year's local elections, with all 24 councillors to be elected for a five-year term of office from 4 local electoral areas (LEAs) by single transferable vote. Following a recommendation of the 2018 Boundary Committee, the boundaries of the LEAs were altered from those used in the 2014 elections.

Fianna Fáil gained 1 additional seat to increase their numbers to 11 while also increasing their vote by 4%. Fine Gael gained 2 seats and also increased their vote by 2%. Labour and the Greens retained their previous position but it was a disastrous election for Sinn Féin. The party lost all 3 seats, including Sean Tyrell, the partner of Kathleen Funchion TD and saw a significant drop in their vote-share. Breda Gardner, a sitting Independent who also contested the Ireland South European Parliament constituency unsuccessfully, failed to retain her seat.

Results by party

Results by local electoral area

Callan–Thomastown

Castlecomer

Kilkenny

Piltown

Results by gender

Changes Since 2019 Local Elections
†Kilkenny Green Party Cllr Malcolm Noonan was elected as a Teachta Dála (TD) for Carlow–Kilkenny at the 2020 general election. Maria Dollard was co-opted to fill the vacancy on 24 February 2020.

Footnotes

Sources

References

2019 Irish local elections
2019